Renacer is DLG's first album after their breakup with previous lead singer Huey Dunbar. The album features Yahaira Vargas, otherwise known as Miss YaYa, as the new lead singer. The album received a Grammy nomination for "Best Tropical Latin Album.

Features
Renacer features long time group contributor Fragancia along with an invited guest singer Ness and Rapper/Singer/DJ, DJ Napoles(Napo). DLG released a new hit via radio in February 2008 called "Quiero decirte que te amo" which is a remake of Italian ballad of Laura Pausini, and also a Peruvian folk song cover called "Toro mata" (The Bull Kills). Also included is the remake of the ballad that was now done Salsa style of "Pero me acuerdo de ti", which was done by Christina Aguilera and was featured on her album "Mi Reflejo", which was written by songwriter Rudy Pérez. Sergio George had also included on the album of live performances of Miss Ya Ya and group doing the hit songs, "No morirá", "Volveré", "Muévete" and "Juliana".

Track listing
 Quiero decirte que te amo
 Toro mata
 Pero me acuerdo de ti
 Conmigo quédate
 El sueño se acabó (Tal vez)
 No soy esa mujer
 No morirá
 Muévete
 Volveré
 La quiero a morir
 Juliana

Chart position

References

2007 albums
Dark Latin Groove albums
Albums produced by Sergio George